Diptychophora huixtla is a moth in the family Crambidae. It was described by Bernard Landry in 1990. It is found in Chiapas, Mexico.

References

Diptychophorini
Moths described in 1990